This is a round-up of the 1995 Sligo Senior Football Championship. Eastern Harps regained the Owen B. Hunt Cup following a comfortable win over Tubbercurry in the latter's last final appearance to date. Other notable points from the Championship included the surprise exit of holders Tourlestrane, after a heavy defeat to unfancied Drumcliffe/Rosses Point, and the relegation of St. Patrick's, Dromard, after a long and successful spell at Senior level lasting some three decades, and seven titles.

First round

Quarter finals

Semi-finals

Sligo Senior Football Championship Final

References

 Sligo Champion (July–September 1995)

Sligo Senior Football Championship
Sligo Senior Football Championship